Malguénac is a commune in the Morbihan department of Brittany in north-western France.

Geography

Malguénac is border by Cléguérec to the north, by Séglien to the west, by Guern to the south and by Pontivy and Le Sourn to the east. Apart from the village centre, there are many hamlets in the commune. Historically, Malguénac belongs to Vannetais.

Demographics
Inhabitants of Malguénac are called in French Malguénacois. After having declined for a long time, the population of the municipality has been increasing steadily since 1975.

Map

History

An epidemic of plague occasioned several deaths between March and October 1598 in the parish.

See also
Communes of the Morbihan department

References

External links

 Mayors of Morbihan Association 

Communes of Morbihan